The Hebrew Academy of Nasssau County (HANC) is a K-12, comprehensive, Modern Orthodox Jewish school system, located in Nassau County, New York.

History

In 1953, Nassau County was virtually empty of Jewish education. Through the dedicated efforts of Rabbi Meyer and Goldie Fendel, and a small group of individuals, the vision to establish a Hebrew day school on Long Island was conceived.

Today, HANC’s four campuses, the Samuel and Elizabeth Bass Golding Early Childhood Center and Elementary School (two buildings) in West Hempstead, the HANC Plainview Elementary School and Joshua Waitman Early Childhood Center (one building) in Plainview, and the HANC Middle School (also referred to as the Moses Hornstein Educational Center) and Brookdale High School (one building) in Uniondale, serve more than twelve hundred students, from nursery through high school, who come from fifty communities throughout Long Island and Queens.

After the Fendels made aliyah, Rabbi Shlomo Wahrman took the helm as principal and Rosh Yeshiva.

Notable alumni
 Devorah Blachor, author
 Rabbi Menachem Creditor
 Nathan Englander, author
 Alice Feiring
 David M. Friedman (born 1958), United States Ambassador to Israel
 David Harsanyi, writer
 Rabbi Irwin Kula

References

External links

Modern Orthodox Jewish day schools in the United States
Educational institutions established in 1953
Schools in Nassau County, New York
Jewish day schools in New York (state)
Private high schools in New York (state)
Private middle schools in New York (state)
Private elementary schools in New York (state)
Jews and Judaism in Nassau County, New York
1953 establishments in New York (state)
Jewish organizations established in 1953